Benchmark-driven investment strategy is an investment strategy where the target return is usually linked to an index or combination of indices of the sector or any other like S&P 500.

With the Benchmarks approach the investor chooses an index of the market (benchmark). The goal of the fund manager is to try to beat the index performance-wise.

The strategic asset allocation is usually delegated to the benchmark chosen
The asset managers stay concentrated to tactical asset allocation and fund (security) selection
No volatility control over time
Without volatility constraints over a long period the investor is expected to get higher returns

See also 
 Liability-driven investment strategy

References

Further reading
Hendry, John, et al. "Responsible ownership, shareholder value and the new shareholder activism." Competition & Change 11.3 (2007): 223-240.
Ladekarl, Jeppe, and Sara Zervos. "Housekeeping and plumbing: the investability of emerging markets." Emerging Markets Review 5.3 (2004): 267-294.
Leibowitz, Martin L., Simon Emrich, and Anthony Bova. "Modern Portfolio Management." (2008).

Investment management